Listed are many semiconductor scale examples for various metal–oxide–semiconductor field-effect transistor (MOSFET, or MOS transistor) semiconductor manufacturing process nodes.

Timeline of MOSFET demonstrations

PMOS and NMOS

CMOS (single-gate)

Multi-gate MOSFET (MuGFET)

Other types of MOSFET

Commercial products using micro-scale MOSFETs

Products featuring 20 μm manufacturing process
 RCA's CD4000 series of integrated circuits (ICs) beginning in 1968.

Products featuring 10 μm manufacturing process

 Intel 4004, the first single-chip microprocessor CPU, launched in 1971.
 Intel 8008 CPU launched in 1972.
 MOS Technology 6502 1 MHz CPU launched in 1975 (8 μm).

Products featuring 8 μm manufacturing process
 Intel 1103, an early dynamic random-access memory (DRAM) chip launched in 1970.

Products featuring 6 μm manufacturing process

 Toshiba TLCS-12, a microprocessor developed for the Ford EEC (Electronic Engine Control) system in 1973.
 Intel 8080 CPU launched in 1974 was manufactured using this process.
 The Television Interface Adaptor, the custom graphics and audio chip developed for the Atari 2600 in 1977.
 MOS Technology SID, a programmable sound generator developed for the Commodore 64 in 1982.
 MOS Technology VIC-II, a video display controller developed for the Commodore 64 in 1982 (5 μm).

Products featuring 3 μm manufacturing process

 Intel 8085 CPU launched in 1976. 
 Intel 8086 CPU launched in 1978.
 Intel 8088 CPU launched in 1979.
 Motorola 68000 8 MHz CPU launched in 1979 (3.5 μm).

Products featuring 1.5 μm manufacturing process

 NEC's 64kb SRAM memory chip in 1981.
 Intel 80286 CPU launched in 1982.
 The Amiga Advanced Graphics Architecture (initially sold in 1992) included chips such as Denise that were manufactured using a 1.5 μm CMOS process.

Products featuring 1 μm manufacturing process

 NTT's DRAM memory chips, including its 64kb chip in 1979 and 256kb chip in 1980.
 NEC's 1Mb DRAM memory chip in 1984.
 Intel 80386 CPU launched in 1985.

Products featuring 800 nm manufacturing process

 NTT's 1Mb DRAM memory chip in 1984.
 NEC and Toshiba used this process for their 4Mb DRAM memory chips in 1986.
 Hitachi, IBM, Matsushita and Mitsubishi Electric used this process for their 4Mb DRAM memory chips in 1987.
 Toshiba's 4Mb EPROM memory chip in 1987.
 Hitachi, Mitsubishi and Toshiba used this process for their 1Mb SRAM memory chips in 1987.
 Intel 486 CPU launched in 1989.
 microSPARC I launched in 1992.
 First Intel P5 Pentium CPUs at 60 MHz and 66 MHz launched in 1993.

Products featuring 600 nm manufacturing process

 Mitsubishi Electric, Toshiba and NEC introduced 16Mb DRAM memory chips manufactured with a 600nm process in 1989.
 NEC's 16Mb EPROM memory chip in 1990.
 Mitsubishi's 16Mb flash memory chip in 1991.
 Intel 80486DX4 CPU launched in 1994.
 IBM/Motorola PowerPC 601, the first PowerPC chip, was produced in 0.6 μm.
 Intel Pentium CPUs at 75 MHz, 90 MHz and 100 MHz.

Products featuring 350 nm manufacturing process

 Sony's 16Mb SRAM memory chip in 1994.
 NEC VR4300 (1995), used in the Nintendo 64 game console.
 Intel Pentium Pro (1995), Pentium (P54CS, 1995), and initial Pentium II CPUs (Klamath, 1997).
 AMD K5 (1996) and original AMD K6 (Model 6, 1997) CPUs.
 Parallax Propeller, 8 core microcontroller.

Products featuring 250 nm manufacturing process

 Hitachi's 16Mb SRAM memory chip in 1993.
 Hitachi and NEC introduced 256Mb DRAM memory chips manufactured with this process in 1993, followed by Matsushita, Mitsubishi Electric and Oki in 1994.
 NEC's 1Gb DRAM memory chip in 1995.
 Hitachi's 128Mb NAND flash memory chip in 1996.
 DEC Alpha 21264A, which was made commercially available in 1999.
 AMD K6-2 Chomper and Chomper Extended. Chomper was released on May 28, 1998.
 AMD K6-III "Sharptooth" used 250 nm.
 Mobile Pentium MMX Tillamook, released in August 1997.
 Pentium II Deschutes.
 Dreamcast console's Hitachi SH-4 CPU and PowerVR2 GPU, released in 1998.
 Pentium III Katmai.
 Initial PlayStation 2's Emotion Engine CPU.

Processors using 180 nm manufacturing technology

 Intel Coppermine E- October 1999
 Sony PlayStation 2 console's Emotion Engine and Graphics Synthesizer – March 2000
 ATI Radeon R100 and RV100 Radeon 7000 – 2000
 AMD Athlon Thunderbird – June 2000
 Intel Celeron (Willamette) – May 2002
 Motorola PowerPC 7445 and 7455 (Apollo 6) – January 2002

Processors using 130 nm manufacturing technology

 Fujitsu SPARC64 V – 2001
 Gekko by IBM and Nintendo (GameCube console) – 2001
 Motorola PowerPC 7447 and 7457 – 2002
 IBM PowerPC G5 970 – October 2002 – June 2003
 Intel Pentium III Tualatin and Coppermine – 2001-04
 Intel Celeron Tualatin-256 – 2001-10-02
 Intel Pentium M Banias – 2003-03-12
 Intel Pentium 4 Northwood- 2002-01-07
 Intel Celeron Northwood-128 – 2002-09-18
 Intel Xeon Prestonia and Gallatin – 2002-02-25
 VIA C3 – 2001
 AMD Athlon XP Thoroughbred, Thorton, and Barton
 AMD Athlon MP Thoroughbred – 2002-08-27
 AMD Athlon XP-M Thoroughbred, Barton, and Dublin
 AMD Duron Applebred – 2003-08-21
 AMD K7 Sempron Thoroughbred-B, Thorton, and Barton – 2004-07-28
 AMD K8 Sempron Paris – 2004-07-28
 AMD Athlon 64 Clawhammer and Newcastle – 2003-09-23
 AMD Opteron Sledgehammer – 2003-06-30
 Elbrus 2000 1891ВМ4Я (1891VM4YA) – 2008-04-27 
 MCST-R500S 1891BM3 – 2008-07-27 
 Vortex 86SX –

Commercial products using nano-scale MOSFETs

Chips using 90 nm manufacturing technology

 Sony–Toshiba Emotion Engine+Graphics Synthesizer (PlayStation 2) – 2003
 IBM PowerPC G5 970FX – 2004
 Elpida Memory's 90 nm DDR2 SDRAM process – 2005
 IBM PowerPC G5 970MP – 2005
 IBM PowerPC G5 970GX – 2005
 IBM Waternoose Xbox 360 Processor – 2005
 IBM–Sony–Toshiba Cell processor – 2005
 Intel Pentium 4 Prescott – 2004-02
 Intel Celeron D Prescott-256 – 2004-05
 Intel Pentium M Dothan – 2004-05
 Intel Celeron M Dothan-1024 – 2004-08
 Intel Xeon Nocona, Irwindale, Cranford, Potomac, Paxville – 2004-06
 Intel Pentium D Smithfield – 2005-05
 AMD Athlon 64 Winchester, Venice, San Diego, Orleans – 2004-10
 AMD Athlon 64 X2 Manchester, Toledo, Windsor – 2005-05
 AMD Sempron Palermo and Manila – 2004-08
 AMD Turion 64 Lancaster and Richmond – 2005-03
 AMD Turion 64 X2 Taylor and Trinidad – 2006-05
 AMD Opteron Venus, Troy, and Athens – 2005-08
 AMD Dual-core Opteron Denmark, Italy, Egypt, Santa Ana, and Santa Rosa
 VIA C7 – 2005-05
 Loongson (Godson) 2Е STLS2E02 – 2007-04
 Loongson (Godson) 2F STLS2F02 – 2008-07
 MCST-4R – 2010-12
 Elbrus-2C+ – 2011-11

Processors using 65 nm manufacturing technology

 Sony–Toshiba EE+GS (PStwo) – 2005
 Intel Pentium 4 (Cedar Mill) – 2006-01-16
 Intel Pentium D 900-series – 2006-01-16
 Intel Celeron D (Cedar Mill cores) – 2006-05-28
 Intel Core – 2006-01-05
 Intel Core 2 – 2006-07-27
 Intel Xeon (Sossaman) – 2006-03-14
 AMD Athlon 64 series (starting from Lima) – 2007-02-20
 AMD Turion 64 X2 series (starting from Tyler) – 2007-05-07
 AMD Phenom series
 IBM's Cell Processor – PlayStation 3 – 2007-11-17
 IBM's z10
 Microsoft Xbox 360 "Falcon" CPU – 2007–09
 Microsoft Xbox 360 "Opus" CPU – 2008
 Microsoft Xbox 360 "Jasper" CPU – 2008–10
 Microsoft Xbox 360 "Jasper" GPU – 2008–10
 Sun UltraSPARC T2 – 2007–10
 AMD Turion Ultra – 2008-06
 TI OMAP 3 Family – 2008-02
 VIA Nano – 2008-05
 Loongson – 2009
 NVIDIA GeForce 8800GT GPU – 2007

Processors using 45 nm technology

 Matsushita released the 45 nm Uniphier in 2007.
 Wolfdale, Yorkfield, Yorkfield XE and Penryn are Intel cores sold under the Core 2 brand.
 Intel Core i7 series processors, i5 750 (Lynnfield and Clarksfield)
 Pentium Dual-Core Wolfdale-3M are current Intel mainstream dual core sold under the Pentium brand.
 Diamondville, Pineview are current Intel cores with hyper-threading sold under the Intel Atom brand.
 AMD Deneb (Phenom II) and Shanghai (Opteron) Quad-Core Processors, Regor (Athlon II) dual core processors , Caspian (Turion II) mobile dual core processors.
 AMD (Phenom II) "Thuban" Six-Core Processor (1055T)
 Xenon in the Xbox 360 S model.
 Sony–Toshiba Cell Broadband Engine in PlayStation 3 Slim model – September 2009.
 Samsung S5PC110, as known as Hummingbird.
 Texas Instruments OMAP 36xx.
 IBM POWER7 and z196
 Fujitsu SPARC64 VIIIfx series
 Espresso (microprocessor) Wii U CPU

Chips using 32 nm technology

 Toshiba produced commercial 32Gb NAND flash memory chips with the 32nm process in 2009.
 Intel Core i3 and i5 processors, released in January 2010
 Intel 6-core processor, codenamed Gulftown
 Intel i7-970, was released in late July 2010, priced at approximately US$900
 AMD FX Series processors, codenamed Zambezi and based on AMD's Bulldozer architecture, were released in October 2011. The technology used a 32 nm SOI process, two CPU cores per module, and up to four modules, ranging from a quad-core design costing approximately US$130 to a $280 eight-core design.
 Ambarella Inc. announced the availability of the A7L system-on-a-chip circuit for digital still cameras, providing 1080p60 high-definition video capabilities in September 2011

Chips using 24–28 nm technology
 SK Hynix announced that it could produce a 26 nm flash chip with 64 Gb capacity; Intel Corp. and Micron Technology had by then already developed the technology themselves. Announced in 2010.
 Toshiba announced that it was shipping 24 nm flash memory NAND devices on August 31, 2010.
In 2016 MCST's 28 nm processor Elbrus-8S went for serial production.

Chips using 22 nm technology

 Intel Core i7 and Intel Core i5 processors based on Intel's Ivy Bridge 22 nm technology for series 7 chip-sets went on sale worldwide on April 23, 2012.

Chips using 20 nm technology
 Samsung Electronics began mass production of 64Gb NAND flash memory chips using a 20 nm process in 2010.

Chips using 16 nm technology
 TSMC first began 16nm FinFET chip production in 2013.

Chips using 14 nm technology

 Intel Core i7 and Intel Core i5 processors based on Intel's Broadwell 14 nm technology was launched in January 2015.
 AMD Ryzen processors based on AMD's Zen or Zen+ architectures and which uses 14 nm FinFET technology.

Chips using 10 nm technology

 Samsung announced that it had begun mass production of multi-level cell (MLC) flash memory chips using a 10nm process in 2013. On 17 October 2016, Samsung Electronics announced mass production of SoC chips at 10 nm.
 TSMC began commercial production of 10 nm chips in early 2016, before moving onto mass production in early 2017.
 Samsung began shipping Galaxy S8 smartphone in April 2017 using the company's 10 nm processor.
 Apple delivered second-generation iPad Pro tablets powered with TSMC-produced Apple A10X chips using the 10 nm FinFET process in June 2017.

Chips using 7 nm technology

 TSMC began risk production of 256 Mbit SRAM memory chips using a 7 nm process in April 2017.
 Samsung and TSMC began mass production of 7 nm devices in 2018.
 Apple A12 and Huawei Kirin 980 mobile processors, both released in 2018, use 7 nm chips manufactured by TSMC.
AMD began using TSMC 7 nm starting with the Vega 20 GPU in November 2018, with Zen 2-based CPUs and APUs from July 2019, and for both PlayStation 5  and Xbox Series X/S  consoles’ APUs, released both in November 2020.

Chips using 5 nm technology

 Samsung began production of 5 nm chips (5LPE) in late 2018.
 TSMC began production of 5 nm chips (CLN5FF) in April 2019.

Chips using 3 nm technology

TSMC have announced plans to release 3nm devices during 2021–2022.
Samsung Electronics have begun risk production of 3 nm GAAFET transistors in June of 2022.

See also
 Foundry model
 MOSFET
 Semiconductor device fabrication
 Transistor count

References 

International Technology Roadmap for Semiconductors lithography nodes
MOSFETs